Lukáš Vaculík (born 8 June 1962) is a Czech actor.

Selected filmography

Film
 Love Between the Raindrops (1979)
 King Thrushbeard (1984)
 Tankový prapor (1991)
 Helluva Good Luck (1999)
 Helluva Good Luck 2 (2001)
 Jak básníci neztrácejí naději (2004)
 Příběh kmotra (2013)
 How Poets Wait for a Miracle (2016)
 Metanol (2018)

Television
 Strážce duší (2005–2009)
 Rapl (2016–2019)
 Temný kraj (2017–2019)
 The Defender (2021)

References

External links
 

1962 births
Living people
Male actors from Prague
Czech male film actors
Czech male stage actors
Czech male television actors
21st-century Czech male actors
20th-century Czech male actors
Prague Conservatory alumni